Marco Sanudo was a lord of the island of Milos in Frankish Greece.

He was a son of William I Sanudo and the brother of Nicholas I Sanudo and John I Sanudo, who were all Dukes of the Archipelago.

He married an unknown wife and had a daughter Fiorenza I Sanudo, Lady of Milos, who married in 1383 Francesco I Crispo, who also became the tenth Duke of the Archipelago.

References

 Ancestry of Sultana Nur-Banu (Cecilia Venier-Baffo)

People from the Duchy of the Archipelago
Marco
People from Milos
Year of birth unknown
Year of death unknown
14th-century Venetian people